The 1927 Canterbury by-election was a parliamentary by-election for the British House of Commons constituency of Canterbury, Kent on 24 November 1927.

Vacancy
The by-election was caused by the elevation to the peerage of the sitting Unionist MP, Rt Hon. Ronald McNeill on 4 November 1927. He had been MP here since winning the seat at its creation in 1918.

Election history
From its first election in 1918 onwards, Canterbury was a safe Unionist seat. The result at the last General Election was

Candidates
On 7 November 1927 The Canterbury Unionist Association chose 58-year-old Sir William Wayland as their candidate to defend the seat. He served as Mayor of Deptford from 1914 to 1920, for which he was knighted in the 1920 New Year Honours. 
The Canterbury Liberal Association re-adopted David Carnegie as their candidate to challenge for the seat. He had fought the seat at the last General Election. He had represented the Canadian Government on numerous commissions. He was a member of the Executive Committee of the League of Nations Union. 
On 15 November 1927 the local Labour Party met and decided not to run a candidate.

Campaign
Polling Day was set for 24 November 1927, just 20 days after the announcement of the vacancy, allowing for virtually no campaign.

Agricultural issues dominated the election.

Liberal Leader David Lloyd George visited Canterbury to speak in support of the Liberal candidate.

On 19 November 1927 voters polled in the 1927 Southend by-election which saw the Unionists hold the seat with a swing to the Liberals of less than 5%.

At an eve of poll Unionist meeting the former Canterbury MP Lord Cushendun criticised "Ignorant Liberal Bleatings".

Result
Despite a swing of 13% to the Liberals, Wayland was able to hang onto the seat with some ease.

Aftermath
The Labour Party intervened in the next contest and enabled the Unionists to increase their majority. The result at the following General Election;

References

See also
 List of United Kingdom by-elections
 United Kingdom by-election records
 

1927 elections in the United Kingdom
By-elections to the Parliament of the United Kingdom in Kent constituencies
1927 in England
History of Canterbury
1920s in Kent